Ridgeway is an unincorporated community in Harlan County, in the U.S. state of Kentucky.

History
A post office called Ridgeway was established in 1925, and remained in operation until 1932. The community took its name from the Ridgeway Coal Company.

References

Unincorporated communities in Harlan County, Kentucky
Unincorporated communities in Kentucky